Eden Sike Cave is a small cave in Mallerstang in the Eden valley in Cumbria, England  north of Hell Gill. This drops into a passage where a wet crawl leads downstream towards the resurgence, and a roomier passage going upstream. The upstream passage soon deteriorates into more awkward going which eventually passes a small but awkward climb into an inlet passage up to the right. The right-hand passage passes a section of sharp, steeply angled rock (Bacon Slicer Rift) into a chamber where the way on is a tight, wet passage where the airspace becomes minimal.

The cave was originally explored by members of the Northern Pennine Club in 1960, and extended in 1982 by Ian Broadhurst and Dave Lamont. The sump was dived by members of the Cave Diving Group in 1975.

References

Wild caves
Limestone caves
Caves of Cumbria
Mallerstang